Białobłocie refers to the following places in Poland:

 Białobłocie, Greater Poland Voivodeship
 Białobłocie, Lubusz Voivodeship